Lenroy Thomas (born 13 March 1985) is a Jamaican professional boxer who held the Commonwealth heavyweight title from 2017 to 2018.

Career
Born in St. Catherine, Jamaica and based in St. Petersburg, Florida since 1998, Thomas made his professional debut in April 2006 with a points loss to Ruben Rivera. He won his next 16 fights before defeat to Arron Lyons in December 2010. In August 2013 he suffered a fourth-round knockout at the hands of Dominic Breazeale. He won his next two fights before joining ESPN's 2015 Boxcino Tournament, in which he beat Jason Estrada in the quarter-final before being knocked out by Andrey Fedosov in the semi-final. 

In May 2017 he faced Dave Allen for the vacant Commonwealth heavyweight title at Bramall Lane stadium in Sheffield, winning the title on a split decision.

Professional boxing record

References

External links

1985 births
Living people
Jamaican male boxers
heavyweight boxers
People from Saint Catherine Parish
20th-century Jamaican people
21st-century Jamaican people